Marcin Feliks Król (May 18 1944 - November 25 2020) was a Polish philosopher, historian of ideas, publicist and professor of the University of Warsaw. Democratic opposition activist in the Polish People's Republic.

Participant in the March events of 1968, imprisoned in the same year for several months. A long-time collaborator of Tygodnik Powszechny weekly, co-founder and editor-in-chief of the Res Publica magazine. In 1975, signatory to Letter of 59 against changes to the Constitution of the People's Republic of Poland.

He was participant in the Round Table talks and a member of the Solidarity Citizens' Committee with Lech Wałęsa. He was the chairman of the Stefan Batory Foundation.

References

1944 births
2020 deaths
Polish dissidents
Polish crime writers
Polish male non-fiction writers
Polish opinion journalists
Polish political prisoners
University of Warsaw alumni
Academic staff of the University of Warsaw
Solidarity (Polish trade union) activists
Fellows of Collegium Invisibile
Members of the Polish Academy of Sciences
Officers of the Order of Polonia Restituta

20th-century Polish philosophers
21st-century Polish philosophers